The 1980 United States House of Representatives elections was an election for the United States House of Representatives on November 4, 1980, to elect members to serve in the 97th United States Congress. They coincided with the election of Ronald Reagan as president, defeating Democratic incumbent Jimmy Carter. Reagan's victory also allowed many Republican House candidates to secure elections. The Republicans gained a net of 35 seats from the Democratic Party. The Democrats nonetheless retained a significant majority, unlike the Senate elections, where Republicans gained control of the chamber. However, many Democratic congressmen from the south (known as "Boll weevils") frequently took conservative stances on issues, allowing Republicans to have a working ideological majority for some of President Reagan's proposals during his first two years in office.

This election marked the first time since Reconstruction that Republicans won a sizable majority of Representatives from a Deep South state (South Carolina). It was also the first time that the new Libertarian Party received the third-largest share of the popular vote in both chambers of Congress. , this is the last time that Republicans won a majority of seats in the Minnesota delegation. This is the earliest House election with a currently serving member, that being Chris Smith and Hal Rogers.

Overall results
Summary of the November 4, 1980, United States House of Representatives election results

Source: Election Statistics - Office of the Clerk

Special elections 

In these special elections, the winner was seated during 1980 or before January 3, 1981; ordered by election date.

Alabama

Alaska

American Samoa 
See Non-voting delegates, below.

Arizona

Arkansas

California

Colorado

Connecticut

Delaware

District of Columbia 
See Non-voting delegates, below.

Florida

Georgia

Hawaii

Guam 
See Non-voting delegates, below.

Idaho

Illinois

Indiana

Iowa

Kansas

Kentucky

Louisiana

Maine

Maryland

Massachusetts

Michigan

Minnesota 

As of 2021, this is the last time the Republican Party held a majority of congressional districts from Minnesota.

Mississippi

Missouri

Montana

Nebraska

Nevada

New Hampshire

New Jersey

New Mexico

New York

North Carolina

North Dakota

Ohio

Oklahoma

Oregon

Pennsylvania

Puerto Rico 
See Non-voting delegates, below.

Rhode Island

South Carolina

South Dakota

Tennessee

Texas

U.S. Virgin Islands 
See Non-voting delegates, below.

Utah

Vermont

Virginia

Washington

West Virginia

Wisconsin

Wyoming

Non-voting delegates 

|-
! 

|-
! 
| Walter Fauntroy
|  | Democratic
| 1971
| Incumbent re-elected.
| nowrap | 

|-
! 

|-
! 

|-
! 
| Melvin H. Evans
|  | Republican
| 1978
| New member elected.
| nowrap | 

|}

See also
 1980 United States elections
 1980 United States gubernatorial elections
 1980 United States presidential election
 1980 United States Senate elections
 96th United States Congress
 97th United States Congress

Notes

References 

 
November 1980 events in the United States